Port Coquitlam station is a stop on the West Coast Express commuter rail line connecting Vancouver to Mission, British Columbia, Canada. The station is located on the south side of the Canadian Pacific Railway (CPR) tracks in Port Coquitlam, just off Kingsway Avenue. The station opened in 1995, when the West Coast Express began operating. 280 park and ride spaces are available. All services are operated by TransLink.

Services
Port Coquitlam is served by five West Coast Express trains per day in each direction: five in the morning to Vancouver, and five in the evening to Mission. The station is adjacent to a bus loop and park-and-ride facility, which are served by the local bus and Community Shuttle minibus services.

Bus routes

Port Coquitlam railway station provides bus connections within the city of Port Coquitlam and to the cities of Vancouver and Coquitlam. Bus bay assignments are as follows:

References

Port Coquitlam
1995 establishments in British Columbia
Railway stations in Canada opened in 1995
West Coast Express stations